OSAP may refer to:

Ontario Student Assistance Program
Aleppo International Airport
Office of Systems, Analyses and Planning, part of the National Energy Technology Laboratory
Oxford Studies in Ancient Philosophy